The 2019 Comoros Premier League is the top level football competition in the Comoros.

Regional leagues

Mwali
Final table.

Ndzuwani
Final table.

Ngazidja
Final table.

National championship
The champions of the three regional leagues of each island will take part in the final tournament to determinate the overall champions.

Table

National championship clubs' stadiums

References

Football leagues in the Comoros
Premier League
Comoros